University of California School of Law may refer to:

 UC Berkeley School of Law, one of 14 schools and colleges at the University of California, Berkeley
 UC Davis School of Law (King Hall), an American Bar Association approved law school located in Davis, California on the campus of the University of California, Davis
 University of California, Hastings College of the Law, a public law school in San Francisco, California, located in the Civic Center neighborhood
 University of California, Irvine School of Law, the law school at the University of California, Irvine
 University of California, Los Angeles School of Law, the law school of UCLA, located in the Westwood neighborhood of Los Angeles, California, United States